Bill Deal & the Rhondels were an American pop band, formed in 1959 in Portsmouth, Virginia, crossing blue-eyed soul and beach music.

Career
They had three hit singles in 1969, "May I" (U.S. #39), "I've Been Hurt" (U.S. #35), "What Kind of Fool (Do You Think I Am)" (U.S. #23). Their single "Swingin' Tight" reached (U.S. #85) in December 1969.  "Nothing Succeeds Like Success" reached (US #63) on the charts in the spring of 1970. The band disbanded in 1975, but reformed and still carries on the tradition even after the passing of Bill Deal.

Members
Bill Deal (born July 8, 1944, died December 10, 2003) - vocals, organ, electric piano, bass pedals (1959-1983)
Ammon Tharp (born Ammon Chester Tharp on July 5, 1942, in Norfolk, Virginia, died September 22, 2017) - vocals, drums (1959-1983)
George Bell - saxophone (1961-1963)
Ronnie Hallman - trumpet (1961-1963)
Jackie Shelton - bass (1961-1963)
Joel Smith - guitar (1961-1963)
Bill Weaver - saxophone (1962-1965)
J.T. Anderson - guitar (1962-1965)
Jimmy Alsbrook - drums (1962)
David Williams - trumpet (1961-??; 1975-1977)
Ken Dawson - trumpet (1963-1970)
Don Quisenberry - bass (1964-1978)
Rollie Ligart - trumpet (1965-1969)
Mike Kerwin - guitar, trumpet (1965-1978)
Tom Pittman - saxophone (1966-1969)
Ronny Rosenbaum - trombone (1966-1971)
Bob Fisher - saxophone, guitar (1969-1976)
Jeff Pollard - trumpet (1969-1973)
Gary Hardy - trumpet (1968-1969 & 1971-1976)
Freddy Owens - saxophone, vocals (1971-1979)
Alan Porter - bass (1978–79)
Steve Ambrose - saxophone, flute, vocals (2004 - )
Tom Cole - drums (1980-1983)
And many others

Freddy Owens murder

On March 4, 1979, band member Ernest Frederick "Freddy" Owens, joined after 1970 and served as lead vocalist as well as playing sax and bass. He was robbed and shot to death by Jeremiah Carr at a Holiday Inn motel in Richmond, Virginia, where the band had a show earlier that evening. He had attempted to stop Carr from escaping after Carr raped his wife. Two shots wounded another band member in the room. While Bill Deal kept going on with the Rhondels for another four years, he never really got over this incident and quit the music business in 1983.

Discography

Albums

Bill Deal and the Rhondels, Vintage Rock, Heritage HTS 35,003, 1969

The material for this album was recorded in New York City between July 25, 1968 (May I) and March 10, 1969 (multiple), with the most tracks recorded at Bell Sound Studios on March 10, 1969. The "Swingin' Tight" track ("Swinging Tight" is often cited, but is not the official title spelling of the song.  "Swinging Tight" is the title to the album released in 1980), first recorded March 10, 1969, is distinct from the similarly-named track on the second album, below and is a slow version of the song.

Side 1

 I've Been Hurt
 Touch Me
 Hooked On A Feeling
 I've Got To Be Me
 Nothing Succeeds Like Success
 Soulful Strut

Side 2

 Hey Bulldog
 Swingin' Tight (slow version) 
 May I
 I'm Gonna Make You Love Me
 Are You Ready For This
 I've Got My Needs
 Change My Mind

The Best of Bill Deal & The Rhondels, Heritage HTS 35,006, 1970

The material for this album, which substantially overlaps the Vintage Rock album, was recorded in New York City between July 25, 1968 ("May I") and October 30, 1969 ("Harlem Shuffle"), with the most tracks recorded at Bell Sound Studios on March 10, 1969. The "Swingin' Tight" track, recorded on October 3, 1969, is distinct from the similarly named track on the first album, above and is a faster single edit version.

Side 1

 What Kind of Fool Do You Think I Am
 Touch Me
 Harlem Shuffle
 May I
 I've Got My Needs
 Ain't Too Proud to Beg

Side 2

 Nothing Succeeds Like Success
 Swingin' Tight (fast, single version)
 Hey Bulldog
 Are You Ready For This
 Tuck's Theme
 I've Been Hurt

Singles

"May I" b/w "Day By Day My Love Grows Stronger" (Heritage, 1968)

"I've Been Hurt" b/w "I've Got My Needs" (Heritage, 1969)

"What Kind of Fool Do You Think I Am" b/w "Swingin' Tight" (Heritage, 1969)

"Swingin' Tight" (Barkin & Barash) b/w "Tuck's Theme" (Heritage, 1969) (AUS #80)

"Hey Bulldog" b/w "I'm Gonna Make You Love Me" (Heritage, 1970)

"Nothing Succeeds Like Success"  (AUS #37)

"It's Too Late" (Heritage, 1972) (US #108)

See also
Trio Galleta

References

Www.billdealsband.com
Horn Rock Heaven
Bill Deal Online

Musical groups from Virginia
Musicians from Portsmouth, Virginia
Woodrow Wilson High School (Portsmouth, Virginia) alumni
American soul musical groups